Arthur Tien Chin (Cantonese: Chan Sui-Tin; October 23, 1913 – September 3, 1997) was a pilot from the United States who participated in the Second Sino-Japanese War. Chin was compelled to defend his father's homeland when Japan invaded China. He was part of the first group of U.S. volunteer combat aviators. Chin is recognized as the United States' first flying ace in World War II.

Early life and military career
Chin was born in Portland, Oregon to Fon Chin, who was from Taishan, China, and Eva Wong, who may have been of Peruvian background. Despite his name, Chin's birth certificate listed him as being "mulatto". Motivated by the Japanese invasion of China, Chin enrolled in flight school (at the Chinese Flying Club of Portland) in 1932, and along with 13 other Chinese Americans including John "Buffalo" Huang Xinrui and Hazel Ying Lee, he left for China and joined the Canton Provincial Air Force under General Chen Jitang as the first and original group of American volunteer combat aviators, and from there was sent to additional aerial-gunnery training with the Luftwaffe at Lagerlechfeld, Germany; returning to China to see the Guangdong Provincial Air Force integrated into the central government's air force under the KMT.

As full-scale war broke out with the Battle of Shanghai, he initially flew in combat with the 28th Pursuit Squadron of the 5th Pursuit Group of Curtiss Hawk IIs led by Capt. Chan Kee-Wong, based in Jurong airbase (known to Cantonese-speaking pilots as Chuyung), engaging Japanese aircraft in an aerial shootout for the first time on 16 August 1937; IJN G3M medium-heavy bombers were already beginning their attack on Jurong airbase when Arthur Chin and Chan Kee-Wong just managed to takeoff in their antiquated Hawk IIs, and barely able to keep up with the sleek and fast G3Ms, Chin was able to score many hits on the G3M likely the lead bomber of Buntaicho (flight leader) Lt. Osugi of Lt. Cmdr. Nitta's second Shotai of the Kanoya Kokutai, puncturing its fuel tanks and wounding a crewmember. Unfortunately for Chin, the lack of speed also meant he was an easy target for the Japanese tail-gunners as his Hawk II floated practically like a sitting-duck at zero degree deflection behind the G3Ms, and suffering multiple hits from the Japanese machine gun fire, his Curtiss-Wright Cyclone engine stopping 2 bullets, Chin had to break-off pursuit at the mouth of the Yangtze and make a forced-landing on an airfield in Jiaxing (Chia-hsing). Lt. Osugi's G3M, was hit 58 times with a gunner wounded, was initially on a course back to Matsuyama airbase in Taiwan, but losing fuel at an alarming rate, Osugi considered turning back to force land at the Japanese legation in Shanghai. Instead, lightening the G3M by jettisoning equipment and anything that can be pried loose, Osugi managed keep the bomber in flight long enough on a safe diversion away from interception by Chinese fighter planes, to Cheju-do between the Chinese mainland and the southwestern coast of Korea, landing or crashing just in time as his fuel ran out. Although written off, this G3M bomber had been credited as Art Chin's first air-to-air "kill" despite the fact that he did not see his "kill" crashing. Arthur Chin would later split command of the 28th PS, 5th PG with Capt. Chan Kee-Wong into two smaller squadrons as the demand for air force units were needed in the northern and southern fronts of the war against the Imperial Japanese advances; Capt. Chan and half of the 28th squadron heading for Taiyuan, and Lt. Chin and other half of the 28th heading for Guangzhou. He would soon transition into the more powerful and much faster Gloster Gladiator fighter plane, ultimately being credited with destroying nine enemy aircraft between 1937 and 1939.

In 1939, while flying a Gloster Gladiator, the fighter in which he scored 6.5 of his 8.5 aerial victories, he was hit by enemy fire and forced to bail out of his burning aircraft, and although he parachuted to safety, he suffered serious burn injuries. Nevertheless, after several years of surgery and recovery, and an escape from the Japanese occupation of Hong Kong, he returned to China in 1944 to fly supplies over the Himalayas, a route known as the "Hump".

Later life and legacy
Chin is recognized as America's first ace in World War II. A half-century after the war ended, the U.S. government recognized Chin as an American veteran by awarding him the Distinguished Flying Cross and Air Medal. About a month after Chin died, on October 4, 1997, he was inducted into the Hall of Fame of the American Airpower Heritage Museum in Midland, Texas as the first American ace of World War II.

After his aviation career, Chin became a postal worker in his hometown of Portland. On January 29, 2008, Congressman Representative David Wu (D-Oregon) introduced House Resolution 5220 to name a United States Post Office in Aloha, Oregon after Major Arthur Chin as the "Major Arthur Chin Post Office Building". It was unanimously approved by the House Committee on Oversight and Government Reform. President Bush signed it into law on May 7, 2008.

References

Bibliography

 Cheung, Raymond. OSPREY AIRCRAFT OF THE ACES 126: Aces of the Republic of China Air Force. Oxford: Osprey Publishing, 2015. .
 徐 (Xú), 露梅 (Lùméi). 隕落 (Fallen): 682位空军英烈的生死档案 - 抗战空军英烈档案大解密 (A Decryption of 682 Air Force Heroes of The War of Resistance-WWII and Their Martyrdom). 东城区, 北京， 中国: 团结出版社, 2016. .

External links
 Biplane Fighter Aces: China: Major 'Arthur' 'Art' Chin Shui-Tin  a more detailed history of his military career.
 Blog entry in Chinese detailing his life and service

1913 births
1997 deaths
American World War II flying aces
Aviation pioneers
Military personnel of the Republic of China in the Second Sino-Japanese War
Military personnel from Portland, Oregon
Recipients of the Distinguished Flying Cross (United States)
Republic of China Air Force personnel
Chinese aviators
American aviators of Chinese descent
Aviators from Portland, Oregon
Chinese World War II flying aces
United States Army Air Forces pilots of World War II
American military personnel of Chinese descent